Paulo Teixeira Jorge (May 15, 1929 – June 26, 2010) was an Angolan politician who served as the Foreign Minister of Angola from 1976 to 1984. He also served as governor of Benguela province, and as President of the National Assembly of Angola. He was one of the first leaders of the liberation struggle of Angola against Portuguese colonial domination. During his exile in France in the early 1960s he worked on the shop floor of a factory.

See also 
Foreign relations of Andorra

References

External links

1934 births
2010 deaths
Angolan diplomats
Foreign ministers of Angola
Governors of Benguela
Governors of Cuanza Norte
People from Benguela